Jakšić is a town and a municipality in Slavonia, Croatia. The population of the village was 4,437 in 2001, with 93% being Croats. It is located in the middle of a valley called Vallis Aurea known for its natural wealth.

Culture

In popular culture
In late November 2022 the village attracted regional media attention when local resident was reported to police by his neighbour and with the Croatian Police subsequently submitting an indictment proposal for "insulting the moral feelings of citizens" for rising of the flag of Yugoslavia on the private home on the anniversary of the former Yugoslav Republic Day. Some lawyers criticized the decision of the Police arguing that the Yugoslav flag as such is not a forbidden symbol while the legal provision for "insulting the moral feelings of citizens" was from a dated 1977 law prescribing 50-200 Deutsche Mark fine.

References

Populated places in Požega-Slavonia County
Slavonia
Municipalities of Croatia